The alpine darner, Austroaeschna flavomaculata, is a species of dragonfly in the family Telephlebiidae, that is known to be present in the mountainous regions of New South Wales and Victoria, Australia. Although the male was first described in 1916, the female and larvae were not described until 1982.

Austroaeschna flavomaculata is a very dark dragonfly with pale markings. It appears similar to the multi-spotted darner, Austroaeschna multipunctata, which is found in small mountain streams in south-eastern Australia.

Gallery

References

Telephlebiidae
Odonata of Australia
Insects of Australia
Endemic fauna of Australia
Taxa named by Robert John Tillyard
Insects described in 1916